Dragan Kujović (Serbian Cyrillic: Драган Кујовић; 1948–2010) was a politician from the Republic of Montenegro and a member of the Democratic Party of Socialists of Montenegro. He served as acting President of Montenegro from 19 to 22 May 2003.

References

Democratic Party of Socialists of Montenegro politicians
Presidents of Montenegro
1948 births
2010 deaths
Education ministers of Montenegro